Dame Deirdre Joan Hine DBE FFPH FRCP FLSW (née Curran; born 16 September 1937) is a Welsh medical doctor. In 1984 she began her career as a public health physician in Wales. She was chair of the Commission for Health Improvement from 1999 to 2004.

Biography
Hine was born to David Alban Curran and his wife, Noreen Mary (née Cliffe), and raised in Cardiff. She attended Heathfield House (Cardiff) and Charlton Park (Cheltenham) schools before earning her MBBCh degree at the Welsh National School of Medicine (now Cardiff University School of Medicine) in 1961. In 1963 she married Raymond Hine and the couple had two sons. She was a medical practitioner at Cardiff's Royal Infirmary. She trained in public health medicine, becoming a specialist in community medicine in 1974. 

Her career included, Principal Medical Officer, Welsh Office (1984); Deputy Chief Medical Officer (1985); Director, Breast Cancer Screening Service, Wales (1988); and Chief Medical Officer, Wales (1990). Hine was affiliated with several organisations including Non-executive director of Dwr Cymru Welsh Water; Vice-President, Marie Curie Cancer Care; and Member, Science Committee for Cancer Research UK.

She retired in 1997 and was appointed to the Audit Commission the following year. Hine was named as chair of the Commission for Health Improvement in August 1999, a position which she held until that body was abolished in 2004. She was elected President of the Royal Society of Medicine (2000–02) and later served terms as chair of the BUPA Foundation (2004–11), President of the British Medical Association (2005–06) and President of the Royal Medical Benevolent Fund (2008–13).

In 2001 Hine was appointed as an independent member to the House of Lords Appointments Commission.

She chaired the UK's official review into the 2009 swine flu pandemic.

Awards and honours
Hine was appointed Dame Commander of the Order of the British Empire "for services to medicine in Wales" in 1997.

She received honorary fellowships in:
 Royal College of Surgeons of England
 Royal College of Anaesthetists
 Royal College of General Practitioners
 Royal Pharmaceutical Society of Great Britain

References

External links
Breast Cancer Screening Service
Shaw Prize.org
Writings

1937 births
Chief Medical Officers for Wales
Dames Commander of the Order of the British Empire
Living people
Medical doctors from Cardiff
Welsh civil servants
20th-century Welsh medical doctors
21st-century Welsh medical doctors
Welsh people of Irish descent
Place of birth missing (living people)
Fellows of the Learned Society of Wales
Welsh women medical doctors
Presidents of the Royal Society of Medicine